The 1984 NHK Trophy was held at the Yoyogi National Stadium in Tokyo on November 23–25. Medals were awarded in the disciplines of men's singles, ladies' singles, pair skating, and ice dancing.

Results

Men

Ladies

Pairs

Ice dancing

External links
 1984 NHK Trophy

Nhk Trophy, 1984
NHK Trophy